Zef is an Albanian masculine given name. It is a short form of the Hebrew name Yossef (יוֹסֵף) and a variant of Joseph. The name Zef may refer to:

People
Zef Bushati (born 1953), Albanian diplomat
Zef Gashi (born 1938), Montenegrin archbishop
Zef Jubani (1818–1880), Albanian writer
Zef Kolombi (1907–1949), Albanian painter
Zef Mala (1915–1979), Albanian writer
Zef Pllumi (1924–2007), Albanian priest and writer
Zef Skiroi (1865–1927), Albanian writer
Zef Serembe (1844–1901), Albanian poet

See also
 Yossef (disambiguation)
 Zeff (surname)
 Zev (disambiguation)

Albanian masculine given names